Skobelevka is a rural locality (a village) and the administrative center of Khokhlovskoye Rural Settlement, Permsky District, Perm Krai, Russia. The population was 1,005 as of 2010. There are 19 streets.

Geography 
Skobelevka is located 41 km north of Perm (the district's administrative centre) by road. Zagrishinskoye is the nearest rural locality.

References 

Rural localities in Permsky District